KF Flamurtari Debresh is a football club based in the village of Debresh near Gostivar, North Macedonia. They are currently competing in the Macedonian Third League (West Division).

History
The club was founded in 1977.

References

External links
Club info at MacedonianFootball 
Football Federation of Macedonia 

Flamutari Debreše
Association football clubs established in 1977
1977 establishments in the Socialist Republic of Macedonia
FK
Flamurtari Debreshe